Sandusky Township is one of the sixteen townships of Crawford County, Ohio, United States. As of the 2010 census the population was 459.

Geography
Located in the eastern part of the county, it borders the following townships:
Cranberry Township - north
Auburn Township - northeast corner
Vernon Township - east
Jefferson Township - south
Whetstone Township - southwest
Liberty Township - west

No municipalities are located in Sandusky Township.

Name and history
Sandusky Township was named from the Sandusky River, which flows through its southern part.

Statewide, other Sandusky Townships are located in Richland and Sandusky counties.

Government
The township is governed by a three-member board of trustees, who are elected in November of odd-numbered years to a four-year term beginning on the following January 1. Two are elected in the year after the presidential election and one is elected in the year before it. There is also an elected township fiscal officer, who serves a four-year term beginning on April 1 of the year after the election, which is held in November of the year before the presidential election. Vacancies in the fiscal officership or on the board of trustees are filled by the remaining trustees.

References

External links
County website

Townships in Crawford County, Ohio
Townships in Ohio